Vetle Skagastølstinden (or Vesle Skagastølstind) is one of the peaks constituting Skagastølstindane ("Skagastøl peaks") in the Hurrungane mountain range and is among Norway's highest. It lies directly between the mountains Midtre Skagastølstind, Store Skagastølstind, and Sentraltind.

Name
The first element is the genitive of the name of the mountain farm Skagastølen and the last element is tind which means "mountain peak".  The mountain farm (dairy farm) Skagastølen belongs to the farm Skagen in Luster and  stølen is the finite form of støl which means "mountain farm". Skagen is the finite form of skage which means "headland" or "promontory" and the name is equivalent to the famous Skagen in Denmark.  The words vetle and vesle mean "the small".

See also
 List of mountains in Norway by height

References

Mountains of Vestland
Jotunheimen
Luster, Norway